Aștileu is a commune in Bihor County, Crișana, Romania, 45 km from the border with Hungary. It is composed of four villages: Aștileu, Călățea (Kalota), Chistag (Keszteg) and Peștere (Körösbarlang). At the 2011 census, 87.94% of the population were Romanians, 5.2% Roma, 4.48% Slovaks, 1.55% Hungarians and 0.23% Germans. 

The closest town to Aștileu is Aleșd, on the opposite bank of the Crișul Repede. There is a small church. Aștileu is located on the Aleșd-Beiuș route.

References

Communes in Bihor County
Localities in Crișana